The Müller G.M.G. II was a German single engine, tandem seat sports monoplane from 1928. Its high wing was unusually mounted.

Design and development
The G.M.G. II was a high wing, strut braced monoplane of wooden construction. Its wing had a single spar and was plywood covered from the spar forward to form a torsion resistant D-box. Behind the spar the wing was fabric covered.  It was braced on each side with a single, short, airfoil section strut to the lower fuselage longeron and mounted centrally on an arched continuation of the upper fuselage structure from the engine installation, over the tandem cockpits, to behind the seating.

Behind the wing leading edge the fuselage was flat sided and plywood covered.  In the nose a three-cylinder Anzani engine was mounted in an inverted Y position, its cylinder heads projecting from a curved, metal cowling with upper concave curvature following the one upright cylinder.  This curvature was replicated in the ply covering between the cowling and the front cockpit, giving the pilot a reasonable forward view on either side. Access to the seats was eased by a pair of doors. The G.M.G. II had a simple, fixed, narrow track undercarriage with mainwheels on a rubber sprung single axle mounted on two short legs from the lower fuselage. Behind the rear cockpit the fuselage narrowed vertically to a conventional tail with the tailplane on top of the fuselage and with a tall, tapered, round topped fin and rudder.

The G.M.G. II was publicly displayed at the Berlin Aero Show of 1928.

Specifications

References

1920s German sport aircraft
High-wing aircraft
Single-engined tractor aircraft
Aircraft first flown in 1928